is the 2008 Kamen Rider Japanese tokusatsu television series produced by Toei Company and Ishimori Productions. It is the series' ninth series in its Heisei era, and 18th series overall since the debut of Kamen Rider in 1971. It premiered on January 27, 2008, following the finale of Kamen Rider Den-O, and aired as a part of TV Asahi's 2008 Super Hero Time block with Engine Sentai Go-onger. The series was advertised to have horror film themes, such as Kamen Rider Kiva being a vampire. The first episode began with a commemoration of the series in honor of the seventieth anniversary of Shotaro Ishinomori's birthday.

Synopsis
22 years after the disappearance of his father, Wataru Kurenai lives in an infamous "haunted house" where he is destined as Kamen Rider Kiva to fight Fangires, a species of life force-draining vampires who can assume stained glass-like monster body that his father fought years ago before his disappearance. Wataru also deals with Kamen Rider Ixa, who is part of an organization seeking to destroy the Fangire menace, and the Fangires' Rider, Kamen Rider Saga, Wataru’s half-brother Fangire who later becomes the present-day Kamen Rider Dark Kiva at the finale. The story is split between Wataru in the present (2008–09) and his father Otoya in the past (1986–87), slowly revealing the link between the Fangire race and Kiva.

The characters of Kamen Rider Kiva are found in two related periods where the heroes fight the Fangires and protect a few of them who are non-hostile:
 From 1986 until 1987, Otoya Kurenai, Fangire Hunter Yuri Aso, and the three respective sole surviving monster races who will become Wataru’s familiars (Jiro the Wolfen, Ramon the Merman, and Riki the Franken) utilize Kamen Rider Ixa Ver. I system to fight against the newly-born Fangires, while also being able to redeem a few of them to live with humanity, such as the former Fangire Queen, Maya. Following the defection of Kivat III’s father Kivat II from the Fangire King, the original Dark Kiva, Otoya sacrifices his life by transforming himself into the second Dark Kiva to destroy the misanthropist Fangire leader.
 From 2008 until 2009, Otoya's son Wataru (as Kamen Rider Kiva), Keisuke Nago (as Kamen Rider Ixa Ver. X), and Yuri's daughter Megumi (also a Fangire Hunter), as well as their new and old allies fight against the remaining hostile Fangires, including the resurrected Fangire King. After being joined by their former enemy Taiga Nobori, Wataru’s half-brother at the finale, the Fangire King is permanently destroyed and the heroes maintain peace between human and non-human races aside from the surviving non-hostile Fangires, followed by Keisuke and Megumi’s marriage.

Episodes

Each episode's title is a word or phrase relating to music and a phrase describing the episode separated by a symbol from musical notation. For example, the second episode's title is written in Japanese as "". From episode 2 onward, Kivat begins the majority of episodes by stating a piece of trivia about music, art, chess, and other subjects. From episode 30 onward, Tatsulot joins the opening statement as he and Kivat provide recaps of the previous episode.

Films

Climax Deka

A movie titled  opened in theaters on April 12, 2008. It is a crossover between the characters of Kiva and Kamen Rider Den-O, who join forces to fight a new evil Imagin who has teamed up with the Fangire Clan. Alongside Climax Deka, a short film titled  was shown as a double feature.

King of the Castle in the Demon World

 opened in Japanese theaters on August 9, 2008. It featured two new Riders who have been shown in silhouettes in Japanese children's magazines: , who is a monster hunter named  portrayed by Shouma Yamamoto, and is partnered . The movie takes place in an alternate universe, as trying to place the story of the movie anywhere within the story of the series always leaves events out of place and would cancel out other events. Furthermore, Shouma Yamamoto portrays Takato Shiramine in the Kamen Rider Kiva movie, but he also portrays Taiga Nobori in the actual series.

"Den-Liner, Into Space!"
 is a planetarium show that featured the cast of Kiva and Den-O to teach children about the universe. It was shown at the Kagoshima Municipal Science Hall's planetarium between January 2 and March 30, 2009.

Adventure Battle DVD

In the Hyper Battle DVD , Wataru Kurenai, Keisuke Nago, and Otoya Kurenai introduce themselves to a boy (the viewer) who has wandered into the Café mald'amour and offer to teach him how he can be like each of them. After having an "Ixa-cise" with Nago and a special lesson from Otoya, a Fangire attacks and the viewer can choose to transform Kiva into Garulu Form, Basshaa Form, Dogga Form, or the secret DoGaBaKi Emperor Form.

Production
The Kamen Rider Kiva trademark was registered by Toei on October 10, 2007.

King of Vampire

Kivas S.I.C. Hero Saga side story  follows the life of the characters after the finale while expanding on moments in the history of the 1986 storyline. The story had begun running in the January 2010 issue of Monthly Hobby Japan magazine. Like the series' episode titles, the titles of the first three chapters of the S.I.C. Hero Saga follow a similar format, but feature two musically themed titles separated by an item from musical notation (the former is an opera while the latter is a song from said opera, the third names the composer and one of his songs). The last chapter is a retelling of the final scene of the TV series, except instead of Masao and the Neo-Fangires, Kiva-la comes to warn them about the Lion Fangire having turned into a giant Sabbat.
Chapter titles

Novel
, written by Kenji Konuta and supervised by Toshiki Inoue, is part of a series of spin-off novel adaptions of the Heisei Era Kamen Riders. The novel was released on March 18, 2013.

Cast
2008 side
: 
: 
: 
: 
: 
: 
: 
: 
1986 side
: 
: 
: 
No side
: 
: 
: 
: 
: 
: 
: 
: 
: 
, : 
:

Guest actors

: 
: 
: 
: 
: 
: 
: 
: 
: Kouhei Takeda

Songs
Opening theme
"Break the Chain"
Lyrics: Shoko Fujibayashi
Composition: Shuhei Naruse
Arrangement: Tourbillon, Shuhei Naruse
Artist: Tourbillon
The single "Break the Chain" was released on March 26, 2008. In its first day of sales, it made No. 3 on the Oricon daily charts for singles before becoming No. 3 on the weekly charts. In the finale, "Break the Chain" is used as a true ending theme, playing over the end credits instead of over the battle.

Insert themes
"Destiny's Play"
Lyrics: Shoko Fujibayashi
Composition: NKMD
Arrangement: Shuhei Naruse
Artist: TETRA-FANG
Episodes: 8 – 14, 17, 18, 22
The single "Destiny's Play" was released on April 23, 2008. A special edition CD/DVD single was also released containing the music video.  Unlike with Den-O, Kiva does not have a different ending arrangement of Destiny's Play for each of Kiva's different forms. It entered at No. 15 on the Oricon Daily Charts on its release date and reached No. 44 in its second week in the Oricon Weekly Charts. On the Kamen Rider Kiva Original Soundtrack was an included track titled , the performance from episode 12.
"Individual-System"
Lyrics: Shoko Fujibayashi
Composition & Arrangement: Shuhei Naruse
Artist: TETRA-FANG
Episodes: 15, 16, 20, 21
"Individual-System" is described as having a blend of 1980s pop music and contemporary music. It was initially revealed to be the second ending theme when a posting on the Avex blog for Kiva mentioned that an ending theme song for Kamen Rider Ixa was to be arranged by Naruse with lyrics by Fujibayashi, initially called "Individual System." The single was released on June 25, 2008. "Individual-System" is still performed by TETRA-FANG with KOJI on vocals, but there were multiple versions of the song to reflect the different users of the Ixa System.
"Innocent Trap"
Lyrics: Shoko Fujibayashi
Composition & Arrangement: Shuhei Naruse
Artist: TETRA-FANG
Episodes: 19
Toei's website for Kiva lists "Innocent Trap" as Basshaa Form's ending theme.
"Shout in the Moonlight"
Lyrics: Shoko Fujibayashi
Composition & Arrangement: Ryo (of defspiral)
Artist: TETRA-FANG
Episodes: 23
"Shout in the Moonlight" is Garulu Form's ending theme.
"Supernova"
Lyrics: Shoko Fujibayashi
Composition: NAOKI MAEDA
Arrangement: Shuhei Naruse
Artist: TETRA-FANG
Episodes: 24 – 27, 29, 31 – 33, 37 – 39, 41, 42, 45, Finale
"Supernova" is Emperor Form's ending theme.
"Fight for Justice"
Lyrics: Shoko Fujibayashi
Composition & Arrangement: Shuhei Naruse
Artist: Keisuke Nago (Keisuke Kato)
Episodes: 28, 30, 40, 44
This arrangement of "Individual-System" is the first ending theme to be performed by someone other than TETRA-FANG. The single was released on July 30, 2008, with Keisuke Kato providing the vocals. This version was initially titled "Individual-System～Fight for justice～," however the single has since been renamed "Fight for Justice" on the single "Fight for Justice ~Individual-System NAGO ver.~" The song was sampled for a preview in the "Individual-System NAGO advance fist" track on the "Individual-System" single. In its first week on the charts, "Fight for Justice ~Individual-System NAGO ver.~" peaked at 28 on the Oricon Charts.
"Roots of the King"
Lyrics: Shoko Fujibayashi
Composition & Arrangement: Shuhei Naruse
Artist: TETRA-FANG
Episodes: 34 – 36, 43
"Roots of the King" is the theme song for Kamen Rider Dark Kiva and his son Kamen Rider Saga. On September 13, 2008, Naruse announced on the Avex Movie blog for Kiva that the next single to be released by TETRA-FANG was to be titled "Roots of the KING." He also refers to the song as "Roots of the King" on his personal blog, which has since become the title of the song.

Avex's blog for Kiva mentions a song entitled "Bite There Soul" that was written by Naruse and YUJI as a heavy metal song played by street musicians in episode 9 which was planned to be released at a future date, and was subsequently put on the final CD box set as "Bite Their Soul" then released on January 21, 2009. A mini-album released on August 6, 2008, titled SUPERNOVA features the theme songs for Kiva's four additional forms performed by TETRA-FANG. The tracks include "Innocent Trap,", "Shout in the Moonlight," and "Supernova," which has a music video included in a special DVD edition of SUPERNOVA. An unfeatured song from SUPERNOVA titled "Silent Shout" is Dogga Form's theme. Another track from the album "Message" is a tribute song for the character Otoya Kurenai.

Kouhei Takeda has recorded a song titled "This love never ends" as the theme song for Otoya as Ixa. Nana Yanagisawa and Yu Takahashi have also provided their voices for tracks to be included on an album for all characters who have become Kamen Rider Ixa. This song has since been revealed to be titled "Feel the same" on an album titled Inherited-System. Kenji Matsuda as Jiro performs the song "Keep alive" for the album. For a TETRA-FANG album titled DESTINY, Koji Seto has recorded the vocals for a song titled "Mind garden." Several songs from this album are theme songs for the members of the Checkmate Four group: "Lightning to Heaven" for the Rook, "Exterminate Time" for the King (Kamen Rider Dark Kiva), "Eternity Blood" for the Bishop, and "Rainy Rose" for the Queen (Maya). Also on the album is "Prayer~Message 2", another tribute to Otoya.

An album titled Masked Rider Kiva Re-Union was released on June 24, 2009, with some original Kiva songs rearranged. "Destiny's Play" has been rearranged, Koji Seto & Shouma Yamamoto sang "Roots of the King" together, Koji Seto gave his own rendition of "This love never ends", and Kouhei Takeda gave his own rendition of "Supernova".

Notes

References

External links

 at Toei Company

Kiva
2008 Japanese television series debuts
2009 Japanese television series endings
Vampires in television
Sentient objects in fiction
Dark fantasy television series
Japanese supernatural television series
Japanese horror fiction television series
Television series set in 1986
Television series set in 2008